Mohammadali Geraei (born 2 May 1994), also known as Mohammad Ali Geraei or Mohammadali Abdolhamid Geraei, is a Greco-Roman wrestler from Iran. He won a gold medal at the 2018 Asian Games and a bronze medal at the 2017, 2019 and 2021 World Championships.

He competed in the 77kg event at the 2022 World Wrestling Championships held in Belgrade, Serbia.

His brother Mohammadreza Geraei also competes in the Greco-Roman wrestling.

References

External links

 
 
 
 

1994 births
Living people
Iranian male sport wrestlers
World Wrestling Championships medalists
People from Shiraz
Wrestlers at the 2018 Asian Games
Medalists at the 2018 Asian Games
Asian Games medalists in wrestling
Asian Games gold medalists for Iran
Asian Wrestling Championships medalists
Islamic Solidarity Games medalists in wrestling
Wrestlers at the 2020 Summer Olympics
Olympic wrestlers of Iran
Sportspeople from Fars province
21st-century Iranian people
Islamic Solidarity Games competitors for Iran